The 1994 Harvard Crimson football team was an American football team that represented Harvard University during the 1994 NCAA Division I-AA football season. The Crimson tied for last place in the Ivy League.

In their first year under head coach Timothy Murphy, the Crimson compiled a 4–6 record and were outscored 254 to 209. Edward Kinney was the team captain.

Harvard's 2–5 conference record tied for seventh (and worst) in the Ivy League standings. The Crimson were outscored 152 to 124 by Ivy opponents. 

Harvard played its home games at Harvard Stadium in the Allston neighborhood of Boston, Massachusetts.

Schedule

References

Harvard
Harvard Crimson football seasons
Harvard Crimson football
Harvard Crimson football